Ryjet, also known as RYJET - Aerotaxis del Mediterraneo, was a small Spanish airline based in Málaga. Despite the name of the airline its fleet included no jets, only turboprop aircraft.

History
The airline was founded in 1999 and projected to operate air taxi, cargo and charter services covering Spain, Portugal and Morocco. Most of its operations, however, were between Málaga and Melilla. By 2011 the airline established a kind of airbridge between the southern Spanish city and the Spanish possession on the Moroccan coast raising the number of its flights to 108 per month.

Ryjet made headlines in 2007 when it was revealed that it had asked high amounts as down-payments to pilots who wished to work for the company.
In the following years other irregularities were detected in the operation of the airline.  

By March 2012 Ryjet had run into severe financial trouble and it had difficulties paying its bills; three months later —owing to default in payments to its lessors and to its employees— Ryjet announced that it ceased operations.

Fleet
1 Saab 340
1 BAE Jetstream

See also
List of defunct airlines of Spain

References

External links

Airline History; Spain
Helitt Air Nostrum y Ryjet en la Ciudad Autónoma de Melilla
RYJET take off
Ryjet fb page

Defunct airlines of Spain
Airlines established in 1999
Airlines disestablished in 2012
Transport in Andalusia
Transport in Melilla
1999 establishments in Spain